Diamond Bar is a city in eastern Los Angeles County, California, United States. At the 2010 census it had a population of 55,544, and in 2019 the population was estimated to be 55,720. It is named after the "diamond over a bar" branding iron registered in 1918 by ranch owner Frederic E. Lewis (1884–1963). The city features a public Los Angeles County golf course.

Located at the junction of the Pomona and Orange freeways, Diamond Bar is primarily residential with shopping centers interspersed throughout the city. It is surrounded by the communities of Brea, Walnut, Chino Hills, Rowland Heights, Pomona, City of Industry, and South Diamond Bar.

Northern Diamond Bar is a part of the Pomona Unified School District. Southern Diamond Bar is a part of the Walnut Valley Unified School District. The city is also served by International Polytechnic High School. It also has the first hydrogen fueling station to be built in Southern California, near the South Coast Air Quality Management District (SCAQMD) building. Moreover, according to the 2010 United States Census, Diamond Bar has a median household income at one of the top earning percentiles in the country at $88,422, with 5.9% of the population living below the federal poverty line.

History

In 1840, José de la Luz Linares received the  Mexican land grant Rancho Los Nogales (Ranch of the Walnut Trees) from Governor Juan Alvarado. The land grant included Brea Canyon and the eastern Walnut Valley. Linares died in 1847, and his widow sold a part of the ranch to Ricardo Vejar for $100 in merchandise, 100 calves, and the assumption of her late husband's debts. Vejar also owned the Rancho San Jose to the east, and acquired the rest of Rancho Nogales over the next 10 years.

However, Vejar's luck did not last that long. As time wore on – and particularly as the United States government took over California – Rancho Los Nogales was divided and sold into multiple land ranches, the largest of which was the Diamond Bar Ranch. At the time, it was one of the largest working cattle ranches in the western U.S. The entire Diamond Bar Ranch was acquired by the Transamerica Corporation in the 1950s for the purpose of developing one of the nation's first master-planned communities. Transamerica gave the Diamond Bar name to its new community and incorporated the ranch's familiar diamond and bar cattle brand into various logos (many of which are still in use today).

The first houses in this development were built in 1959, adjacent to the future location of the Pomona Freeway, which was built through the area ten years later. The town's development and population grew extremely quickly after that.

Transamerica oversaw all development of the community through the 1960s. The Transamerica Corporation divested itself of all its real estate ventures in the 1970s and 1980s. As a result, the Diamond Bar project was sold to multiple developers and much of its initial master plan was not implemented during the latter half of its development in the 1980s.

The City of Diamond Bar was incorporated on April 18, 1989.

Geography
Diamond Bar's main road, Diamond Bar Boulevard, runs along the bottom of the valley that eventually becomes Brea Canyon, and housing developments overlook the boulevard on both sides from surrounding hills. The city lies roughly between the ends of the Chino Fault and the Whittier Fault, both part of the Elsinore Fault Zone.

Neighboring communities include Walnut, Rowland Heights, and Pomona. Diamond Bar is also adjacent to the Inland Empire region, with Chino Hills directly to the east, and to the south of Diamond Bar lie the cities of Brea and La Habra in Orange County.

Both the CA-60 Freeway and the CA-57 Freeway run through Diamond Bar. the I-10 Freeway is just north of the city and CA-71 is just east of the city. Major thoroughfares include Grand Avenue, Diamond Bar Boulevard, Pathfinder Road, Golden Springs Drive, and Brea Canyon Road.

Climate

Demographics

2010
The 2010 United States Census reported that Diamond Bar had a population of 55,544. The racial makeup of Diamond Bar was: 29,144 (52.5%) Asian; 18,434 (33.2%) White (21.3% Non-Hispanic White), 2,288 (4.1%) African American; 178 (0.3%) Native American; 106 (0.2%) Pacific Islander; 3,237 (5.8%) from other races; and 2,157 (3.9%) from two or more races. There were 11,138 residents of Hispanic or Latino origin, of any race (20.1%).

The Census reported that 55,415 people (99.8% of the population) lived in households, 102 (0.2%) lived in non-institutionalized group quarters, and 27 (0%) were institutionalized.

There were 17,880 households, out of which 7,008 (39.2%) had children under the age of 18 living in them, 11,792 (66.0%) were opposite-sex married couples living together, 2,165 (12.1%) had a female householder with no husband present, 886 (5.0%) had a male householder with no wife present. There were 496 (2.8%) unmarried opposite-sex partnerships, and 71 (0.4%) same-sex married couples or partnerships. 2,308 households (12.9%) were made up of individuals, and 740 (4.1%) had someone living alone who was 65 years of age or older. The average household size was 3.10. There were 14,843 families (83.0% of all households); the average family size was 3.38.

The age distribution of the population shows 11,895 people (21.4%) under the age of 18, 5,590 people (10.1%) aged 18 to 24, 13,585 people (24.5%) aged 25 to 44, 17,988 people (32.4%) aged 45 to 64, and 6,486 people (11.7%) who were 65 years of age or older. The median age was 41.0 years. For every 100 females, there were 95.2 males. For every 100 females age 18 and over, there were 92.3 males.

The homeowner vacancy rate was 0.9%; the rental vacancy rate was 5.2%. 45,080 people (81.2% of the population) lived in owner-occupied housing units and 10,335 people (18.6%) lived in rental housing units.

2000
As of the census of 2000, there were 56,287 people, 17,651 households, and 14,809 families residing in the city. The population density was 3,813.2 inhabitants per square mile (1,472.4/km). The racial makeup of the city was 50.4% Asian, 33.3% White, 3.9% Black or African American, 0.33% Native American, 0.12% Pacific Islander, 7.7% from other races, and 4.21% from two or more races. 18.46% of the population were Hispanic or Latino of any race.

There were 17,651 households, out of which 44.4% had children under the age of 18 living with them, 68.3% were married couples living together, 11.1% had a female householder with no husband present, and 16.1% were non-families. 12.5% of all households were made up of individuals, and 2.7% had someone living alone who was 65 years of age or older. The average household size was 3.18 and the average family size was 3.47.

In the city, the age distribution of the population shows 27.0% under the age of 18, 8.8% from 18 to 24, 29.6% from 25 to 44, 27.2% from 45 to 64, and 7.5% who were 65 years of age or older. The median age was 36 years. For every 100 females, there were 96.0 males. For every 100 females age 18 and over, there were 92.0 males.

According to the 2007 estimate, the median income for a household in the city was $87,224, and the median income for a family was $93,185. Males had a median income of $51,059 versus $37,002 for females. The per capita income for the city was $33,540. About 5.0% of families and 6.0% of the population were below the poverty line, including 5.1% of those under age 18 and 6.1% of those age 65 or over.

Government
Diamond Bar City Council is currently headed by Mayor Nancy Lyons. The other council members are Ruth Low, Andrew Chou, Steve Tye, and Stan Liu.

Public services
The Los Angeles County Sheriff's Department (LASD) operates the Walnut/Diamond Bar Station in Walnut, serving Diamond Bar.

The Los Angeles County Department of Health Services operates the Pomona Health Center in Pomona, serving Diamond Bar.

County, state, and federal representation
The city is in the First District of the Los Angeles County Board of Supervisors, represented by Hilda Solis.

Education
The city is primarily divided into two Blue-ribbon districts. Diamond Bar students north of the city power lines are served by four elementary schools, one middle school, and one high school provided by the Pomona Unified School District. Students south of the power lines running through the city are part of the Walnut Valley Unified School District and are served by nine elementary schools, three middle schools, and three high schools.

Economy

Top employers
According to the city's 2012 Comprehensive Annual Financial Report, the top employers in the city are:

Notable people

 Ling Ling Chang, former California state assemblywoman and state senator
 Phillip Chen, California state assemblyman
 Danny Dorn, Major League Baseball player, Arizona Diamondbacks
 Jim Edmonds, retired Major League Baseball player, most notably with the Anaheim Angels and St. Louis Cardinals
 Bob Huff, California state senator
 Tiffany Young, Korean-American singer; member of girl group Girls' Generation 
 Jay Kim, first Korean-American congressman
 Gary Miller, former mayor and congressman
  Alex Morgan, soccer forward, 2015 & 2019 Women's World Cup champion, Olympic gold medalist, member of the United States women's national soccer team
 Teddy Park, South Korean producer and rapper; known for being a major producer for K-pop groups Blackpink, 2NE1, and Big Bang 
 Gary Pettis, former center fielder for the California Angels and current coach for the Houston Astros.
 Snoop Dogg, rapper
 Xavier Scruggs, former first baseman for the St. Louis Cardinals, born in Diamond Bar in 1987.
 Taebin, South Korean rapper and singer; member of hip hop group 1TYM 
 Keith Van Horn, retired NBA player; played with the Philadelphia 76ers, New Jersey Nets, Milwaukee Bucks, and Dallas Mavericks
 Ryan Wendell, offensive lineman for the New England Patriots
 Jason Wright, American businessman and football executive
 Ippei Mizuhara, Japanese interpreter employed by the Los Angeles Angels of Major League Baseball (MLB), most notably serving as Shohei Ohtani's interpreter.

See also

Freeway Complex Fire

References

External links
 

Regional Chamber of Commerce – San Gabriel Valley

 
Cities in Los Angeles County, California
Incorporated cities and towns in California